Cowbane Prairie Natural Area Preserve is a  Natural Area Preserve located in Augusta County, Virginia, along the western slope of the Blue Ridge in the Shenandoah Valley.  It preserves both mesic and wet prairie habitats, as well as a calcareous spring-fed marsh; these areas contain eleven regionally rare plants such as queen-of-the-prairie, blueflag iris, and marsh-speedwell.  Although common in the Midwest, these plants occur only at a handful of sites in Virginia.

The preserve is owned and maintained by the Virginia Department of Conservation and Recreation. It does not include improvements for public access, and visitors must make arrangements with a state-employed land steward prior to visiting.

See also
 List of Virginia Natural Area Preserves

References

External links
Virginia Department of Conservation and Recreation: Cowbane Prairie Natural Area Preserve

Virginia Natural Area Preserves
Protected areas of Augusta County, Virginia
Wetlands of Virginia